Kevin Alderson (born 21 August 1953) is an English former footballer who made two appearances in the Football League playing as a winger for Darlington in the 1970s. He also played non-league football for Shildon.

References

1953 births
Living people
People from Shildon
Footballers from County Durham
English footballers
Association football wingers
Darlington F.C. players
Shildon A.F.C. players
English Football League players